Medicago noeana is a species of flowering plant in the Fabaceae family. It can be found throughout the Middle East. It forms a symbiotic relationship with the bacterium Sinorhizobium meliloti, which is capable of nitrogen fixation.

References

External links
 International Legume Database & Information Services

noeana
Taxa named by Pierre Edmond Boissier
Flora of Syria
Flora of Lebanon and Syria